Vialfrè is a comune (municipality) in the Metropolitan City of Turin in the Italian region Piedmont, located about  north of Turin.

Vialfrè borders the following municipalities: San Martino Canavese, Scarmagno, Agliè, and Cuceglio.

References

Cities and towns in Piedmont